Morant Bay High School in Morant Bay, St Thomas, Jamaica was founded in 1961.

At the time of its opening, St Thomas was the last Jamaican parish without a high school.

The original site was situated on seven or eight acres of land bought from the Methodist Church. An old manse on the site was the first school building with sixty one students attending on the first day of opening in January 1961.

Headteachers

 William Hayden Middleton 1961 - 1966 
 Stanlie Parkins 1966 - 1988
 Howard Jackson 1988 - 1990
 Lebert Jones
 Grace Spence
 Valrie Marshall-Lodge 1991 - 2009
 Mohan Kumar (acting) 2010 - 2014
 Dr. Dalton Shaw 2014 - 2020
 Lorveen Bell-Coates (acting) 2015
 Alice Kumar (acting) 2015 - 2017
 Marsha Ford-Bryan (acting) 2021 - present

References 

Educational institutions established in 1961
Buildings and structures in Saint Thomas Parish, Jamaica
Schools in Jamaica
1961 establishments in Jamaica